Torsten Jöhncke (14 March 1912 – 8 November 1984) was a Swedish ice hockey player. He competed in the men's tournament at the 1936 Winter Olympics.

References

External links
 

1912 births
1984 deaths
Olympic ice hockey players of Sweden
Ice hockey players at the 1936 Winter Olympics
Ice hockey people from Stockholm